The 2021 Little Rock Challenger was a professional tennis tournament played on hard courts. It was the second edition of the tournament which was part of the 2021 ATP Challenger Tour. It took place in Little Rock, Arkansas, United States from 31 May to 6 June 2021.

Singles main-draw entrants

Seeds

 1 Rankings are as of 24 May 2021.

Other entrants
The following players received wildcards into the singles main draw:
  Oliver Crawford
  Ryan Harrison
  Zane Khan

The following player received entry into the singles main draw as an alternate:
  Nick Chappell

The following players received entry from the qualifying draw:
  Alexis Galarneau
  Dayne Kelly
  Stefan Kozlov
  Zachary Svajda

Champions

Singles

  Jack Sock def.  Emilio Gómez 7–5, 6–4.

Doubles

  Nicolás Barrientos /  Ernesto Escobedo def.  Christopher Eubanks /  Roberto Quiroz 4–6, 6–3, [10–5].

References

2021 ATP Challenger Tour
2021 in American tennis
May 2021 sports events in the United States
June 2021 sports events in the United States
2021 in sports in Arkansas
Little Rock Challenger